Little Elkin Creek is a  long 3rd order tributary to the Yadkin River in Wilkes County, North Carolina.

Variant names
According to the Geographic Names Information System, it has also been known historically as:
Little Elkin River

Course
Little Elkin Creek rises about 0.25 miles northeast of Austin, North Carolina and then flows southeasterly to join the Yadkin River at about 1 mile west of Elkin, North Carolina.

Watershed
Little Elkin Creek drains  of area, receives about 50.1 in/year of precipitation, has a wetness index of 355.54, and is about 47% forested.

References

Rivers of North Carolina
Bodies of water of Wilkes County, North Carolina